Manza (Mānzā, Mandja) is a Ubangian language spoken by the Mandja people of the Central African Republic. It is closely related to Ngbaka and may be to some extent mutually intelligible.

Phonology
The phonology consists of the following:

Consonants 

 Sounds /ɾ/ and /ⱱ/ are very rare in word-initial position.
 /ⁿz/ can be heard in free variation as a prenasal affricate sound [ⁿd͡ʒ].
 [l] is only heard in free variation of /j/.
 /j/ can be heard as [ɲ] when preceding a nasal vowel.

Vowels 

 /a/ can have an allophone of [ɐ], when in complementary distribution.

 The nasalization of /ɛ̃/ may also be heard more lower as [æ̃] in free variation.

Writing system

The tones are indicated on the letters using diacritics:
 the middle tone is indicated using the umlaut:  ;
 the high tone is indicated using the circumflex accent: .

References

Gbaya languages
Languages of the Central African Republic
Languages of Cameroon